Leptolaimida is an order of nematodes belonging to the class Chromadorea.

Families:
 Aegialoalaimidae Lorenzen, 1981
 Aphanolaimidae Chitwood, 1936
 Ceramonematidae Cobb, 1933
 Diplopeltoididae Tchesunov, 1990
 Leptolaimidae Örley, 1880
 Ohridiidae Lorenzen, 1981
 Paramicrolaimidae Lorenzen, 1981
 Rhadinematidae Lorenzen, 1981
 Tarvaiidae Lorenzen, 1981
 Tubolaimoididae Lorenzen, 1981

References

Nematodes